Milorad Kojić (born 3 February 1999) is a Serbian professional footballer who plays as a goalkeeper for FK Radnički Niš.

Club career

Early years
Born in Niš, Milorad passed Železničar Niš and Radnički Niš youth categories. His official debut for Radnički Niš in 4 fixture match of the 2018–19 Serbian SuperLiga season against Voždovac after Bulajić injury in 9 minutes of the mach, played on 11 August 2018.

References

External links
 

1999 births
Living people
Sportspeople from Niš
Association football goalkeepers
Serbian footballers
FK Radnički Niš players
FK Timočanin players
FK Radnički Pirot players
Serbian SuperLiga players
Serbian First League players